James William Ellsworth (October 13, 1849 – June 2, 1925) was an American industrialist and a Pennsylvania coal mine owner. The coal town of Ellsworth, Pennsylvania is named after him. He also served as president of the Caxton Club and the Jekyll Island Club.

Ellsworth married Eva Francis Butler on November 4, 1874. They had two children, Lincoln and Claire. But Mrs. Ellsworth died in 1888 at the age of 36. In 1895, Ellsworth married a second time to Julia Clarke Fincke. The second Mrs. Ellsworth lived to be 74 years old; she died in 1921.

In 1907, following the completion of the Monongahela Railway, Ellsworth sold the coal mines to Bethlehem Steel and purchased the Villa Palmieri, Fiesole, in part to further his interests as a collector of art and rare coins.

His son, Lincoln Ellsworth, was a pilot in the Amundsen-Ellsworth Polar Flying Expedition of May 1925 which Ellsworth sponsored. In 1925, Ellsworth died of bronchial pneumonia at his villa near Florence, while awaiting the news of his son's safety.

References

1849 births
1925 deaths
Western Reserve Academy alumni
19th-century American businesspeople
20th-century American businesspeople